The Nutshell is a pub in Bury St Edmunds, Suffolk,  England, that until 2016 claimed to be the smallest pub in Britain, although this claim was challenged by several others, including the Smiths Arms at Godmanstone (now closed) and the Lakeside Inn in Southport.

The pub is certainly diminutive so that no more than ten or fifteen customers can drink inside at any one time. The pub measures . In 1984, a record number of 102 people squeezed into the pub.

The Nutshell has been trading as a pub since 1867, although the building is much older and formerly had other uses. Inside, the dried body of a black cat is displayed, It is around 400 years old and was discovered in 1935 during building work. In former times, the bodies of cats were often placed inside the structure of buildings to bring good luck to the building and its occupants.

The building has been Grade II listed since 1972.

References

External links

Bury St Edmunds
Grade II listed pubs in Suffolk
National Inventory Pubs